is a passenger railway station  located in the city of Minamiashigara, Kanagawa Prefecture, Japan, operated by the Izuhakone Railway.

Lines
Sagami-Numata Station is served by the  Daiyūzan Line, and is located 5.0 kilometers from the line’s terminus at Odawara Station.

Station layout
The station consists of two opposing side platforms connected to a two-story station building by a footbridge.

Platforms

Adjacent stations

History
Sagami-Numata Station was officially opened on October 15, 1925. The current station building was completed in February 1981.

Passenger statistics
In fiscal 2019, the station was used by an average of 1,445 passengers daily (boarding passengers only).

The passenger figures (boarding passengers only) for previous years are as shown below.

Surrounding area
The city border between Odawara and Minamiashigara is at the station, but the station building is located in within Minamiashigara. Prefectural Road 74 runs on the west side of the station, and the Karikawa River on the east side. The station is in a residential area.

See also
List of railway stations in Japan

References

External links

Izuhakone Railway home page 

Railway stations in Japan opened in 1925
Izuhakone Daiyuzan Line
Railway stations in Kanagawa Prefecture
Minamiashigara, Kanagawa